Malcolm Moran is an American sportswriter who has written for four newspapers over 30 years – Newsday, The New York Times,  Chicago Tribune and USA Today.  In April 2006, Moran was named the inaugural Knight Chair in Sports Journalism and Society in the College of Communications at Penn State.

Moran has served as president of the United States Basketball Writers Association (USBWA) in 1988–89 when the organization formalized its awards for women and held its first nationally televised presentation of the player of the year awards. He was inducted into the USBWA Hall of Fame in 2005.

Moran is a 1975 graduate of Fordham University.

External links
 Penn State College of Communications Biography

Sportswriters from New York (state)
Fordham University alumni
Living people
Pennsylvania State University faculty
Year of birth missing (living people)
WFUV people